Papi Kimoto (born 22 July 1976) is a Congolese former professional footballer who played as a striker, most notably for the Congo DR national team and for SC Lokeren and Standard Liège in the Belgian First Division A.

Career
Born in Kinshasa, Kimoto moved to Belgium in 1999, where he played professional football with Sporting Lokeren, Standard Liège and Sint-Truidense V.V.

After he retired from playing, Kimoto became a football manager with a CAF "A" license. Kimoto managed AS Dragons/Bilima and Jeunesse Sportive (Kinshasa) before he was appointed to lead FC Renaissance du Congo in December 2018.

References

External links

1976 births
Living people
Footballers from Kinshasa
Democratic Republic of the Congo footballers
Association football forwards
Democratic Republic of the Congo international footballers
1998 African Cup of Nations players
2002 African Cup of Nations players
Belgian Pro League players
Israeli Premier League players
Liga Leumit players
Cypriot First Division players
Cypriot Second Division players
AS Vita Club players
Hakoah Maccabi Amidar Ramat Gan F.C. players
Maccabi Netanya F.C. players
Maccabi Herzliya F.C. players
Hapoel Petah Tikva F.C. players
K.S.C. Lokeren Oost-Vlaanderen players
Standard Liège players
Sint-Truidense V.V. players
RFC Liège players
Atromitos Yeroskipou players
APEP FC players
Democratic Republic of the Congo football managers
Democratic Republic of the Congo expatriate footballers
Expatriate footballers in Israel
Expatriate footballers in Cyprus
Expatriate footballers in Belgium
Democratic Republic of the Congo expatriate sportspeople in Belgium
Democratic Republic of the Congo expatriate sportspeople in Cyprus
Democratic Republic of the Congo expatriate sportspeople in Israel